This is a list of programs broadcast on BEAM TV.

It was previously known as CTV-31 (Cinema Television) in late 1993, and E! Philippines in 2000. However, it was defunct in 2003 due to low ratings and high cost programming difficulties.

It returned on July 3, 2011, carrying 2008 Beijing Olympics Men's Division, and 1 episode English dub of Hamtaro. Its initial broadcast was The Game Channel, which started on August 15, 2011. Then it was acquired by CHASE on February 15, 2012, to improve its programs from limited (on Christmas Eve 2011) to 24/7 broadcast (on that date). But lately, it was replaced as Jack City (Jack TV's secondary network) which it was launched on October 20, 2012, but then it lessened its air limits from 24/7 broadcasting to 18 hours broadcasting due to NTC regulations on affiliated free TV network. , Jack City is no longer affiliated and aired on the channel as BEAM prepares its DTV transition, and continues to broadcast on cable networks until March 21, 2015, when the channel was rebranded as CT (now defunct).

Current programs

Educational
Ani at Kita sa TV
Knowledge Channel*
Pilipinas HD*

Interactive entertainment
PIE*

Infomercials
TV Shop Philippines*

Religious
Life TV*
Oras ng Himala*
Sunday Mass sa BEAM TV

Talk shows
Talking Heads

Lifestyle
Chinatown TV

Cinema
Sine Pinoy

* Only available on DTT platforms.

Previous programs

CTV-31/E! Philippines Channel 31 era

As BEAM TV

BEAM Channel 31 on test broadcast
2008 Beijing Olympics: Volleyball Men's Edition
Hamtaro

The Game Channel on BEAM Channel 31
America's Got Talent
The Biggest Loser: Season 7
Dance Your A** Off
Family Game Night
Jeopardy!
Minute to Win It
Pictureka!
The Price Is Right
RPN News Watch¹
RPN NewsCap¹
Survivor: Redemption Island
Survivor: South Pacific
Wheel of Fortune
¹RPN programs, both were continued to air on the said original channel after the channel (BEAM TV) axed simulcasting both producing newscasts from original channel on October 2011 until October 29, 2012.

CHASE/Jack City

Blocktimers
TBN Asia on BEAM TV (2014-2015, continuously aired on cable and via BEAM's digital subchannel)
Great Day To Live with Bro. Greg Durante (2014-2016)
O Shopping on BEAM TV (2014-2018, continuously aired as 24/7 channel on Sky Cable, Sky Direct and ABS-CBN TV Plus and as overnight block on ABS-CBN)
Shop TV (2016-2018)
Telenovela Channel on BEAM TV (March 1–2, 2015)
La Madrastra (May 4 – October 18, 2015)
A Woman's Word (May 4 – November 22, 2015)
Big Love (2015-2016)
Love Spell (2015-2016)
TBN Philippines on BEAM TV (2015-2016)
Muchacha Italiana (2015-2016)
The Two Sides of Ana (2016)
Shop Japan on BEAM TV (2015-2018)
The 700 Club Asia on BEAM TV
Inquirer 990 Television on BEAM TV (2016-2020)
EZ Shop on BEAM TV
DepEd TV on BEAM TV (2021-2022)

See also
Broadcast Enterprises and Affiliated Media
Radio Mindanao Network

References

BEAM TV